Luis Felipe Fernández-Salvador Boloña (born 28 February 2000) is an Ecuadorian footballer who plays as a midfielder for Deportivo Cuenca of the First Division of Ecuador.

Career

Youth 
Fernández-Salvador was born in Guayaquil, Ecuador, but moved to the United States when he was five years old. At age 12 he returned to Ecuador, where he stayed for four years and was part of the Emelec academy from 12 to 16 year's old. However, at the age of 16 he returned to North America, where he attended the Shattuck-Saint Mary's academy.

College 
In 2018, Fernández-Salvador attended Clemson University, where he went on to make 69 appearances for the Tigers, scoring eleven goals and tallying 14 assists. In 2020, he was named third-team All-ACC, and in 2021 was on the NCAA College Cup All-Tournament Team as he helped the team to the NCAA national championship.

Professional 
On 11 January 2022, Fernández-Salvador was selected 44th overall in the 2022 MLS SuperDraft by Vancouver Whitecaps FC. On 18 March 2022, he signed a professional contract with club's MLS Next Pro side Whitecaps FC 2 ahead of the league's inaugural season. He went on to make 17 appearances for the team during the 2022 season, scoring three goals.

References

2000 births
Living people
Association football midfielders
C.S. Emelec footballers
Clemson Tigers men's soccer players
Ecuadorian footballers
Ecuadorian expatriate footballers
Ecuadorian expatriate sportspeople in the United States
Expatriate soccer players in the United States
MLS Next Pro players
Vancouver Whitecaps FC draft picks
Whitecaps FC 2 players
Sportspeople from Guayaquil